Cyllene desnoyersi is a fossil species of sea snail, a marine gastropod mollusk in the family Nassariidae, the Nassa mud snails or dog whelks.

There is one subspecies Cyllene desnoyersi lamarcki Cernohorsky, 1975 (synonyms : Cyllene lamarcki Cernohorsky, 1975; Cyllene lyrata (Lamarck, 1822)

Description

The shell grows to a length of 11 mm.

Distribution
The species is distributed in the Atlantic Ocean along Gabon and Angola

References

Further reading
 Bernard, P.A. (Ed.) (1984). Coquillages du Gabon [Shells of Gabon]. Pierre A. Bernard: Libreville, Gabon. 140, 75 plates pp. 
 Gofas, S.; Afonso, J.P.; Brandào, M. (Ed.). (S.a.). Conchas e Moluscos de Angola = Coquillages et Mollusques d'Angola. [Shells and molluscs of Angola]. Universidade Agostinho / Elf Aquitaine Angola: Angola. 140 pp.

External links
 

Nassariidae
Gastropods described in 1825